Stevenson Archer (October 11, 1786 – June 26, 1848) was a judge and United States Representative from Maryland, representing the sixth district from 1811 to 1817, and the seventh district from 1819 to 1821.  His son Stevenson Archer and father John Archer were also U.S. Congressmen from Maryland.

Early life
Archer was born at Medical Hall, near Churchville, Maryland on October 11, 1786 to Catherine (née Harris) and John Archer. He attended Nottingham Academy of Maryland, later graduating from Princeton College in 1805.  He studied law, was admitted to the bar of Harford County, Maryland in 1808, and commenced practice the same year.

Career
From 1809 to 1810, Archer served as a member of the Maryland House of Delegates, and was later elected as a Democrat-Republican to the Twelfth United States Congress to fill the vacancy caused by the resignation of John Montgomery. He was reelected to the Thirteenth and Fourteenth Congresses and served from October 26, 1811 until March 3, 1817. Having reached the Constitutional age of service in the House (25 years of age) less than one month prior to taking his seat, Archer was the youngest member of the Twelfth Congress, which was defined at least in part by the injection of youth into the government. Archer was one of the firmest supporters of the War Hawk agenda in Congress, consistently voting for military preparation and the War of 1812.

In Congress, Archer served as chairman of the Committee on Claims (Thirteenth Congress), and as a member of the Committee on Expenditures in the Department of the Navy (Fourteenth Congress). During the War of 1812, he was paymaster to the Fortieth Maryland Militia, and was appointed on March 5, 1817 by President James Madison as United States judge for the Territory of Mississippi, with powers of Governor, holding court at St. Stephens.

Archer resigned within a year, and returned to Maryland to continue his law practice.  He was elected to the Sixteenth Congress, serving from March 4, 1819 until March 3, 1821, and, in Congress, served as chairman of the Committee on Expenditures in the Department of the Navy. In 1823, Archer was appointed chief judge of the judicial circuit court of Baltimore and Harford Counties and Baltimore City. In 1844, Archer was appointed by Governor Thomas Pratt as chief justice of the Maryland Court of Appeals and served until his death.

Personal life
Archer married Pamela Barney Hays in 1811. Together, they had nine children, including Stevenson Archer. His grandson was Stevenson A. Williams.

On October 6, 1809, Archer was the first man to be made a Master Mason in Mount Ararat Lodge No. 44, in Bel Air Maryland, one of the states oldest and most respected Masonic Lodges.

Archer was a slave owner.

Death
Archer died on June 26, 1848 at Medical Hall. He is interred in the Churchville Presbyterian Church cemetery.

References

External links

1786 births
1848 deaths
People from Churchville, Maryland
Princeton University alumni
Chief Judges of the Maryland Court of Appeals
Members of the Maryland House of Delegates
Democratic-Republican Party members of the United States House of Representatives from Maryland
19th-century American politicians
19th-century American judges
Members of the United States Congress who owned slaves